Kamara is a given name. Notable people with the name include:

Kamara Bacchus (born 1986), British actress and radio personality
Kamara Ghedi (born 1976), Romanian singer
Kamara James (1984–2014), American Olympic fencer

See also
Kamara (surname)